Octacube may refer to:
24-cell or octacube, a 4-dimensional figure
Octacube (sculpture), a large steel sculpture of an octacube
 Eight cubes as the polyhedron net of a hypercube used in Dali's Crucifixion (Corpus Hypercubus)